For the Australian politician, see Alec Thomson.

Alexander Thomson (14 June 1901 – 12 November 1975) was a Scottish footballer who played for Celtic, Ayr United (on loan), Dunfermline Athletic and Scotland, gaining three caps.

He spent 12 years at Celtic, where he was a frequent supplier of chances for the prolific goalscorer Jimmy McGrory, playing 451 times for the club in the Scottish Football League (also being selected for its representative team four times) and Scottish Cup, scoring 99 goals and winning several trophies.

He was not related to Celtic teammates and fellow Scotland internationals John Thomson (a goalkeeper also from Fife and joined the club from Wellesley Juniors, who died from a head injury during a match aged 22) or Bertie Thomson (a winger who died aged 30).

References

Sources

External links
The Celtic Wiki profile

1901 births
1975 deaths
Scottish footballers
Association football inside forwards
Scotland international footballers
Celtic F.C. players
Ayr United F.C. players
Dunfermline Athletic F.C. players
Scottish Football League players
Scottish Football League representative players
People from Buckhaven
Footballers from Fife
Scottish Junior Football Association players
Glencraig Celtic F.C. players
Wellesley Juniors F.C. players